Arbi may refer to:

Arbi (name)
Lake Arbi, lake in Elva, Estonia
Arbi, edible variety of the tuber Colocasia, known in India

See also
Arbi (vegetable), an Indian name of eddoe
Al-Arbi (disambiguation)
Arpi (disambiguation)